No Mercy is a 1986 American crime thriller film starring Richard Gere and Kim Basinger about a policeman who accepts an offer to kill a Cajun gangster. The film grossed over $12 million domestically.

Plot
Eddie Jilette is a Chicago cop on the vengeance trail as he follows his partner's killers to New Orleans to settle his own personal score. Eddie flees through the Louisiana bayous with Michel Duval, the beautiful Cajun mistress of a murderous crime lord who aims to destroy the Chicago detective before he can avenge his partner's murder. Michel and Eddie fall for each other, although they clash repeatedly while handcuffed together as they attempt to elude the brutal underworld figure and his henchmen.

Cast

Reception

Critical response
No Mercy received poor reviews from critics and currently holds a 31% rating on Rotten Tomatoes from 16 reviews, although reviewers praised Gere's performance and the film's atmosphere.

References

External links
 
 
 
 
 
 

1986 films
1986 action thriller films
1980s crime thriller films
Films set in New Orleans
Films set in Louisiana
Films shot in New Orleans
Films shot in North Carolina
Films directed by Richard Pearce
American crime thriller films
American action thriller films
Films scored by Alan Silvestri
TriStar Pictures films
American neo-noir films
1980s English-language films
1980s American films